This is a list of women artists who were born in Colombia or whose artworks are closely associated with that country.

A
Liliana Angulo Cortés (born 1974), painter, sculptor
Débora Arango (1907–2005), painter, ceramist

B
Delfina Bernal (born 1941), painter, multimedia artist
Graciela Bustos, contemporary artist

C
María Fernanda Cardoso (born 1963), Colombian-Australian painter, sculptor, illustrator
Olga de Chica (1921–2016), painter
Esperanza Cortes (born 1957), Colombian-American visual artist

F
Feliza Bursztyn (1933–1982), sculptor

G
Nadia Granados (born 1978), performance artist

M
Sara Modiano (1951–2010), artist

P
Maria E. Piñeres (born 1966), textile artist

R
Claudia Rueda (active since 2000s), illustrator
Ruby Rumié (born 1958), mixed media artist

S
Doris Salcedo (born 1958), sculptor
Fanny Sanín (born 1938), abstract painter
Viviana Spinosa (born 1984), contemporary artist

T
Lucy Tejada (1920–2011), painter
Maria Clara Trujillo (born 1958), painter, sculptor

-
Colombian women artists, List of
Artists, List of Colombian
Artists